Paopi 21 - Coptic Calendar - Paopi 23

The twenty-second day of the Coptic month of Paopi, the second month of the Coptic year. On a common year, this day corresponds to October 19, of the Julian Calendar, and November 1, of the Gregorian Calendar. This day falls in the Coptic season of Peret, the season of emergence.

Commemorations

Saints 

 The martyrdom of Saint Luke the Evangelist

References 

Days of the Coptic calendar